Nazahrah Ansaria Hillmon (born April 5, 2000) is an American professional basketball player for the Atlanta Dream of the Women's National Basketball Association (WNBA). She played college basketball at Michigan, where she is Michigan's all-time leader in rebounds, double-doubles, and free throws made. As a junior she was named a first-team All-American and Big Ten Player of the Year. She also represented the United States at the 2019 FIBA Under-19 Women's Basketball World Cup and won a gold medal.

High school career
Hillmon played four varsity seasons at Gilmour Academy in Gates Mills, Ohio where she started in all 116 career games and amassed 2,057 points and 1,607 rebounds to become the school's all-time leading scorer and rebounder. Hillmon averaged 21 points, 14 rebounds, 2.7 blocks and 2.0 steals per game as a senior to help lead the Lancers to their first OHSAA Division III state championship, after winning back-to-back district and regional titles. Following an outstanding season, she was named  the Division III Northeast Lakes All-District Player of the Year for a second straight season, the All-Ohio Co-Player of the Year and was named a finalist for Ms. Basketball. She became the fourth girls basketball player in state history to score 2,000 points in a high school career. Hillmon verbally committed to play basketball at Michigan on July 4, 2017, following her graduation from Gilmour Academy.

College career

Freshman season
During the 2018–19 season, Hillmon appeared in all 34 games for the Wolverines off the bench, averaging a team-high 13.1 points, 7.0 rebounds and .628 field goal percentage per game. She also had a team-high eight double-doubles during the season. She finished sixth nationally in field goal percentage, the only freshman in the top 50. Following an outstanding season, she was named Big Ten Conference Freshman of the Year by the media, Big Ten Conference Sixth Player of the Year by the coaches, the Big Ten All-First Team and the Big Ten Conference All-Freshman team.

Sophomore season
During the 2019–20 season, Hillmon started all 32 games, scoring in double figures 28 times with 11 double-doubles. She ranked in the top five in Big Ten scoring in points per game (17.4), rebounds per game (8.7) and field-goal percentage (.567). She finished the season with 558 points (9th), 277 rebounds (7th) and shot 56.7 percent (7th) to rank in the top 10 of Michigan all-time season records. Following the season she was named a unanimous All-Big Ten first team selection by both the coaches and media.

Junior season
During the 2020–21 season, Hillmon was named Big Ten Preseason Co-Player of the Year, and named to watch lists for the Katrina McClain Award, the Wade Trophy and Naismith College Player of the Year. On January 21, 2021, Hillmon recorded a career-high 50 points and 16 rebounds, setting the all-time single-game scoring record in Michigan program history, man or woman, and recording the first 50-point game in Michigan basketball history. She surpassed the previous women's record of 45 points set by Diane Dietz in 1982, and men's record of 48 points set by Rudy Tomjanovich in 1969. She also set a new program record for field goals made with 20. She became the second player in Michigan women's basketball history to score more than 40 points, and the third woman with a 50-point game in Big Ten basketball history. 

On March 4, 2021, Hillmon was named a finalist for the Katrina McClain Award for the second straight year. Hillmon ranks fourth nationally in scoring at 25.1 points per game while coming in second in field goal percentage (.648), 17th in rebounding (11.3) and 26th in double-doubles (10). Hillmon has scored at least 18 points in all but one game this season. Following an outstanding season, she was named a unanimous All-Big Ten first team selection by both the coaches and media and named the Big Ten Conference Player of the Year. She became the second player in Big Ten history to earn Freshman of the Year, Sixth Player of the Year and Player of the Year honors in a career. She was named a first-team All-American by Sports Illustrated and USBWA and a second-team All-American by the Associated Press. Hillmon became the first Wolverine to be selected for All-America honors in program history. She was also named University of Michigan Athlete of the Year.

Senior season

During the 2021–22 season, Hillmon was named Big Ten Preseason Player of the Year, and named to watch lists for the Katrina McClain Award, and the Wade Trophy. On January 27, 2022, Hillmon recorded 20 points and 12 rebounds to become Michigan's all-time leading rebounder, passing the previous record of 928 set by Trish Andrew in 1993. Following her outstanding performance, she was named USBWA National Player of the Week. On February 27, Hillmon recorded 18 points and 15 rebounds to become the first player in Michigan program history, man or woman, to score 2,000 points and record 1,000 rebounds. During the 2022 NCAA tournament, she helped Michigan advance to the Elite Eight for the first time in program history, as she recorded a double-double in all four games of the tournament.

Following an outstanding season, she was named a unanimous All-Big Ten first team selection by both the coaches and media, and named to the all-defensive team. On March 10, 2022, Hillmon was named a finalist for the Katrina McClain Award for the third straight year. Hillmon averaged 21.0 points, 9.6 rebounds and 2.2 assists in 33.5 minutes per game, and recorded 17 double-doubles, to move into first place all-time at Michigan. She was named a first-team All-American by the Associated Press, becoming the first player in program history to earn a first-team honor from the AP. She was also named a first-team All-American by WBCA, USBWA, The Athletic, Sports Illustrated and the Wooden Award. She finished her career at Michigan as the program leader in rebounds (1,063), double-doubles (52) and free throws made (487). She ranks second all-time in scoring with 2,183 points, playing 21 fewer games than all-time leading scorer Katelynn Flaherty (2,776).

On March 29, 2022, Hillmon renounced her extra year of eligibility due to the COVID-19 pandemic and declared for the 2022 WNBA draft.

Professional career
On April 11, 2022, Hillmon was drafted in the second round, 15th overall, by the Atlanta Dream in the 2022 WNBA draft. She became Michigan's highest WNBA draft pick ever, and the first Wolverine drafted since Tabitha Pool in 2005.

National team career
Hillmon represented the United States at the 2018 FIBA Under-18 Women's Americas Championship, where she averaged 10.3 points and 5.7 rebounds per game and shot 67 percent in 18.2 minutes per game, and won a gold medal. Hillmon represented the United States at the 2019 FIBA Under-19 Women's Basketball World Cup where she was team captain. She started all seven games of the 2019 tournament, averaging 7.4 points and a team-high 7.6 rebounds per game and won a gold medal. On June 6, 2021, Hillmon was named to team USA for the 2021 FIBA Women's AmeriCup. During the tournament, Hillmon recorded one double-double, and averaged 11.8 points, 7.8 rebounds and 1.5 assists in 21.5 minutes per game, to help lead USA to a gold medal.

Personal life
Hillmon's mother NaSheema Hillmon played college basketball at Vanderbilt and professionally for the Nashville Noise of the American Basketball League (ABL). Hillmon is the niece of professional basketball player Jawad Williams.

Career statistics

College

|-
| style="text-align:left;"|2018–19
| style="text-align:left;"|Michigan
| 34 || 0 || 23.2 || .628 || .000 || .632 || 7.0 || 1.1 || 1.0 || 0.2 || 13.1
|-
| style="text-align:left;"|2019–20
| style="text-align:left;"|Michigan
| 32 || 32 || 33.3 || .567 || .000 || .644 || 8.7 || 2.4 || 0.8 || 0.3 || 17.4
|-
| style="text-align:left;"|2020–21
| style="text-align:left;"|Michigan
| 22 || 22 || 33.6 || .623 || .000 || .757 || 11.4 || 1.3 || 0.6 || 0.4 || 24.0
|-
| style="text-align:left;"|2021–22
| style="text-align:left;"|Michigan
| 29 || 28 || 33.0 || .580 || .000 || .729 || 9.6 || 2.1 || 1.2 || 0.5 || 21.3
|- class="sortbottom"
| style="text-align:center;" colspan="2"|Career
| 117 || 82 || 30.4 || .596 || .000 || .696 || 8.9 || 1.7 || 0.9 || 0.4 || 18.4

WNBA regular season

|-
| style="text-align:left;"| 2022
| style="text-align:left;"| Atlanta
| 34 || 12 || 19.8 || .480 || .000 || .821 || 5.1 || 1.2 || 0.6 || 0.3 || 1.2 || 4.4
|-
| style="text-align:left;"| Career
| style="text-align:left;"|1 year, 1 team
| 34 || 12 || 19.8 || .480 || .000 || .821 || 5.1 || 1.2 || 0.6 || 0.3 || 1.2 || 4.4

See also
Michigan Wolverines women's basketball statistical leaders

References

External links
 Michigan Wolverines bio

2000 births
Living people
All-American college women's basketball players
American women's basketball players
Basketball players from Ohio
Michigan Wolverines women's basketball players
People from Cleveland
Sportspeople from Ohio
United States women's national basketball team players
21st-century American women
Atlanta Dream draft picks
Atlanta Dream players
Basketball players from Cleveland